The Bosniaks (Cyrillic: Бошњаци, ;) are a South Slavic ethnic group native to the Southeast European historical region of Bosnia, which is today part of Bosnia and Herzegovina, who share a common Bosnian ancestry, culture, history and language. They primarily live in Bosnia, Serbia, Montenegro, Croatia, Kosovo as well as in Austria, Germany, Turkey and Sweden. They also constitute a significant diaspora with several communities across Europe, the Americas and Oceania.

Bosniaks are typically characterized by their historic ties to the Bosnian historical region, adherence to Islam since the 15th and 16th centuries, culture, and the Bosnian language. English speakers frequently refer to Bosniaks as Bosnian Muslims or simply as Bosnians, though the latter term can also  denote all inhabitants of Bosnia and Herzegovina (regardless of ethnic identity) or apply to citizens of the country.

Ethnonym 

According to the Bosniak entry in the Oxford English Dictionary, the first preserved use of "Bosniak" in English was by English diplomat and historian Paul Rycaut in 1680 as Bosnack, cognate with post-classical Latin Bosniacus (1682 or earlier), French Bosniaque (1695 or earlier) or German Bosniak (1737 or earlier). The modern spelling is contained in the 1836 Penny Cyclopaedia V. 231/1: "The inhabitants of Bosnia are composed of Bosniaks, a race of Sclavonian origin". In the Slavic languages, -ak is a common suffix appended to words to create a masculine noun, for instance also found in the ethnonym of Poles (Polak) and Slovaks (Slovák). As such, "Bosniak" is etymologically equivalent to its non-ethnic counterpart "Bosnian" (which entered English around the same time via the Middle French, Bosnien): a native of Bosnia.

From the perspective of Bosniaks, bosanstvo (Bosnianhood) and bošnjaštvo (Bosniakhood) are closely and mutually interconnected, as Bosniaks connect their identity with Bosnia and Herzegovina.
 	
The earliest attestation to a Bosnian ethnonym emerged with the historical term "Bošnjanin" (Latin: Bosniensis) which denoted the people of the medieval Bosnian Kingdom. By the 15th century, the suffix -(n)in had been replaced by -ak to create the current form Bošnjak (Bosniak), first attested in the diplomacy of Bosnian king Tvrtko II who in 1440 dispatched a delegation (Apparatu virisque insignis) to the Polish king of Hungary, Władysław Warneńczyk (1440–1444), asserting a common Slavic ancestry and language between the Bosniak and Pole. The Miroslav Krleža Lexicographical Institute thus defines Bosniak as "the name for the subjects of the Bosnian rulers in the pre-Ottoman era, subjects of the Sultans during the Ottoman era, and the current name for the most numerous of the three constituent peoples in Bosnia and Herzegovina. Bosniak, as well as the older term Bošnjanin (in Lat. Bosnensis), is originally a name defining the inhabitants of the medieval Bosnian state".

Linguists have most commonly proposed the toponym Bosnia to be derived from the eponymous river Bosna; believed to be a pre-Slavic hydronym in origin and possibly mentioned for the first time during the 1st century AD by Roman historian Marcus Velleius Paterculus under the name Bathinus flumen. Another basic source associated with the hydronym Bathinus is the Salonitan inscription of the governor of Dalmatia, Publius Cornelius Dolabella, where it is stated that the Bathinum river divides the Breuci from the Osseriates.
 	
Some scholars also connect the Roman road station Ad Basante, first attested in the 5th century Tabula Peutingeriana, to Bosnia. According to the English medievalist William Miller in the work Essays on the Latin Orient (1921), the Slavic settlers in Bosnia "adapted the Latin designation [...] Basante, to their own idiom by calling the stream Bosna and themselves Bosniaks [...]".
 	
According to philologist Anton Mayer the name Bosna could essentially be derived from Illyrian Bass-an-as(-ā) which would be a diversion of the Proto-Indo-European root *bhoĝ-, meaning "the running water". The Croatian linguist, and one of the world's foremost onomastics experts, Petar Skok expressed an opinion that the chronological transformation of this hydronym from the Roman times to its final Slavicization occurred in the following order; *Bassanus> *Bassenus> *Bassinus> *Bosina> Bosьna> Bosna.
 	
Other theories involve the rare Latin term Bosina, meaning boundary, and possible Slavic and Thracian origins. Theories that advocates the link of the name Bosnia, and thus of the Bosniaks with the Early Slavs of northern Europe has initially been proposed by the 19th century historians Joachim Lelewel and Johann Kaspar Zeuss, who considered the name of Bosnia to be derived from a Slavic ethnonym, Buzhans (Latin: Busani), mentioned in the Primary Chronicle and by the Geographus Bavarus in his Description of cities and lands north of the Danube. According to both Lelewel and Zeuss Buzhans settled in Bosnia. The theory of Slavic origin of the name Bosnia and its possible connection with the Slavic tribe of Buzhans, came also to be advocated by the 20th and 21st century Yugoslav and Bosnian historians such as Marko Vego, Muhamed Hadžijahić and Mustafa Imamović.    
 			
For the duration of Ottoman rule, the word Bosniak came to refer to all inhabitants of Bosnia; the use of the term "Bosniak" at that time did not have a national meaning, but a regional one. When Austria-Hungary occupied Bosnia and Herzegovina in 1878, national identification was still a foreign concept to Bosnian Muslims. The inhabitants of Bosnia called themselves various names: from Bosniak, in the full spectrum of the word's meaning with a foundation as a territorial designation, through a series of regional and confessional names, all the way to modern-day national ones. In this regard, Christian Bosnians had not described themselves as either Serbs or Croats prior to the 19th century, and in particular before the Austrian occupation in 1878, when the current tri-ethnic reality of Bosnia and Herzegovina was configured based on religious affiliation. Social anthropologist Tone Bringa develops that "Neither Bosniak, nor Croat, nor Serb identities can be fully understood with reference only to Islam or Christianity respectively, but have to be considered in a specific Bosnian context that has resulted in a shared history and locality among Bosnians of Islamic as well as Christian backgrounds."

Origin 

The Early Slavs, a people from northeastern Europe, settled the territory of Bosnia and Herzegovina (and neighboring regions) after the sixth century (amid the Migration Period), and were composed of small tribal units drawn from a single Slavic confederation known to the Byzantines as the Sclaveni (whilst the related Antes, roughly speaking, colonized the eastern portions of the Balkans).

Recent Anglophone scholarship has tended to downplay the role of migrations. For example Timothy Gregory conjectures that "It is now generally agreed that the people who lived in the Balkans after the Slavic "invasions" were probably for the most part the same as those who had lived there earlier, although the creation of new political groups and arrival of small numbers of immigrants caused people to look at themselves as distinct from their neighbours, including the Byzantines" However, the archaeological evidence paints a picture of widespread depopulation, perhaps a tactical re-settlement of Byzantine populations from provincial hinterlands to Coastal towns after 620 CE.

In former Yugoslav historiography, a second migration of "Serb" and "Croat" tribes (variously placed in the 7th to 9th century) is viewed as that of elites imposing themselves on a more numerous and 'amorphous' Slavic populace, however such a paradigm needs to be clarified empirically.

Eighth century sources mention early Slavophone polities, such as the Guduscani in northern Dalmatia, the principality of Slavs in Lower Pannonia, and that of Serbs (Sorabos) who were 'said to hold much of Dalmatia'.

The earliest reference to Bosnia as such is the De Administrando Imperio, written by the Byzantine Emperor Constantine Porphyrogenitus (r. 913-959). At the end of chapter 32 ("Of the Serbs and of the country they now dwell in"), after a detailed  political history,  Porphyrogenitus asserts that the prince of Serbia has always submitted himself to Rome, in preference to Rome's regional rivals, the Bulgarians. He then gives two lists of kastra oikoumena (inhabited cities), the first being those "en tē baptismenē serbia" (in baptized Serbia; six listed), the second being "εἱς τὸ χορίον Βόσονα, τὸ Κάτερα καί τὸ Δεσνήκ / eis to chorion Bosona, to Katera kai to Desnēk" (in the territory of Bosona, [the cities of] Katera and Desnik).

To Tibor Zivkovic, this suggests that from a tenth century Byzantine viewpoint, Bosnia was a territory within the principality of Serbia. The implicit distinction made by Porphyrogenitus between "baptised Serbia" and the territory of Bosona is noteworthy.

Subsequently, Bosnia might have been nominally vassaled to various rulers from Croatia and Duklja, but by the end of the twelfth century it came to form an independent unit under an autonomous ruler, Ban Kulin, who called himself Bosnian.

In the 14th century a Bosnian kingdom centered on the river Bosna emerged. Its people, when not using local (county, regional) names, called themselves Bosnians.

Following the conquest of Bosnia by the Ottoman Empire in the mid-15th century, there was a rapid and extensive wave of conversion from Christianity to Islam, and by the early 1600s roughly two thirds of Bosnians were Muslim. In addition, a smaller number of converts from outside Bosnia were in time assimilated into the common Bosniak unit. These included Croats (mainly from Turkish Croatia), the Muslims of Slavonia who fled to Bosnia  following the Austro-Turkish war), Serbian and Montenegrin Muhacirs (in Sandžak particularly Islamicized descendants of the Old Herzegovinian and highlander tribes from Brda region, such as Rovčani, Moračani, Drobnjaci and Kuči), and slavicized Vlachs, Albanians and German Saxons.

Genetics 

According to 2013 autosomal IBD survey "of recent genealogical ancestry over the past 3,000 years at a continental scale", the speakers of Serbo-Croatian language share a very high number of common ancestors dated to the migration period approximately 1,500 years ago with Poland and Romania-Bulgaria cluster among others in Eastern Europe. It is concluded to be caused by the Hunnic and Slavic expansion, which was a "relatively small population that expanded over a large geographic area", particularly "the expansion of the Slavic populations into regions of low population density beginning in the sixth century" and that it is "highly coincident with the modern distribution of Slavic languages". The 2015 IBD analysis found that the South Slavs have lower proximity to Greeks than with East Slavs and West Slavs, and "even patterns of IBD sharing among East-West Slavs–'inter-Slavic' populations (Hungarians, Romanians and Gagauz)–and South Slavs, i.e. across an area of assumed historic movements of people including Slavs". The slight peak of shared IBD segments between South and East-West Slavs suggests a shared "Slavonic-time ancestry".

An autosomal analysis study of 90 samples showed that Western Balkan populations had a genetic uniformity, intermediate between South Europe and Eastern Europe, in line with their geographic location. According to the same study, Bosnians (together with Croatians) are by autosomal DNA closest to East European populations and overlap mostly with Hungarians. In the 2015 analysis, Bosnians formed a western South Slavic cluster with the Croatians and Slovenians in comparison to eastern cluster formed by Macedonians and Bulgarians with Serbians in the middle. The western cluster (Bosnians included) has an inclination toward Hungarians, Czechs, and Slovaks, while the eastern cluster toward Romanians and some extent Greeks. Based on analysis of IBD sharing, Middle Eastern populations most likely did not contribute to genetics in Islamicized populations in the Western Balkans, including Bosniaks, as these share similar patterns with neighboring Christian populations.

Y-DNA studies on Bosniaks (in Bosnia and Herzegovina) show close affinity to other neighboring South Slavs. Y-DNA results show notable frequencies of I2 with 43.50% (especially its subclade I2-CTS10228+), R1a with 15.30% (mostly its two subclades R1a-CTS1211+ and R1a-M458+), E-V13 with 12.90% and J-M410 with 8.70%. Y-DNA studies done for the majority Bosniak populated city of Zenica and Tuzla Canton, shows however a drastic increase of the two major haplogroups I2 and R1a. Haplogroup I2 scores 52.20% in Zenica (Peričić et al., 2005) and 47% in Tuzla Canton (Dogan et al., 2016), while R1a increases up to 24.60% and 23% in respective region. Haplogroup I2a-CTS10228, which is the most common haplogroup among Bosniaks and other neighbouring South Slavic populations, was found in one archeogenetic sample (Sungir 6) (~900 YBP) near Vladimir, western Russia which belonged to the I-CTS10228>S17250>Y5596>Z16971>Y5595>A16681 subclade. It was also found in skeletal remains with artifacts, indicating leaders, of Hungarian conquerors of the Carpathian Basin from the 9th century, part of Western Eurasian-Slavic component of the Hungarians. According to Fóthi et al. (2020), the distribution of ancestral subclades like of I-CTS10228 among contemporary carriers indicates a rapid expansion from Southeastern Poland, is mainly related to the Slavs, and the "largest demographic explosion occurred in the Balkans". Principal component analysis of Y-chromosomal haplogroup frequencies among the three ethnic groups in Bosnia and Herzegovina, Serbs, Croats, and Bosniaks, showed that Bosnian Serbs and Bosniaks are by Y-DNA closer to each other than either of them is to Bosnian Croats.

In addition, mtDNA studies shows that the Bosnian population partly share similarities with other Southern European populations (especially with mtDNA haplogroups such as pre-HV (today known as mtDNA haplogroup R0), HV2 and U1), but are for the mostly featured by a huge combination of mtDNA subclusters that indicates a consanguinity with Central and Eastern Europeans, such as modern German, West Slavic, East Slavic and Finnic populations. There is especially the observed similarity between Bosnian, Russian and Finnish samples (with mtDNA subclusters such as U5b1, Z, H-16354, H-16263, U5b-16192-16311 and U5a-16114A). The huge differentiation between Bosnian and Slovene samples of mtDNA subclusters that are also observed in Central and Eastern Europe, may suggests a broader genetic heterogeneity among the Slavs that settled the Western Balkans during the early Middle Ages. The 2019 study of ethnic groups of Tuzla Canton of Bosnia and Herzegovina (Bosniaks, Croats and Serbs) found "close gene similarity among maternal gene pools of the ethnic groups of Tuzla Canton", which is "suggesting similar effects of the paternal and maternal gene flows on genetic structure of the three main ethnic groups of modern Bosnia and Herzegovina".

Identity 

Bosniaks are generally defined as the South Slavic nation on the territory of the former Yugoslavia whose members identify themselves with Bosnia and Herzegovina as their ethnic state and are part of such a common nation, and of whom a majority are Muslim by religion. Nevertheless, leaders and intellectuals of the Bosniak community may have various perceptions of what it means to be Bosniak. Some may point to an Islamic heritage, while others stress the purely secular and national character of the Bosniak identity and its connection with Bosnian territory and history. Moreover, individuals outside Bosnia and Herzegovina may hold their own personal interpretations as well. Some people, such as Montenegrin Abdul Kurpejović, recognize an Islamic component in the Bosniak identity but see it as referring exclusively to the Slavic Muslims in Bosnia. Still others consider all Slavic Muslims in the former Yugoslavia (i.e. including the Gorani) to be Bosniaks.

Although the official policy of the Austrian-Hungarian government in Bosnia and Herzegovina was the promotion of the Bosniak identity, only a small number of Muslim notables accepted the idea of Bosniak nationhood.

In Yugoslavia, there was no official recognition of a special Bosnian Muslim ethnicity. The Constitution of Yugoslavia was amended in 1968 to introduce a Muslim national group for Serbo-Croatian speaking Muslims; effectively recognizing a constitutive nation. Prior to this, the great majority of Bosnian Muslims had declared either Ethnically Undecided Muslim or – to a lesser extent – Undecided Yugoslav in censuses pertaining to Yugoslavia as the other available options were Serb-Muslim and Croat-Muslim. Although it achieved recognition as a distinct nation by an alternative name, the use of Muslim as an ethnic designation was opposed early on as it sought to label Bosniaks a religious group instead of an ethnic one.

During the World War II, Bosnia and Herzegovina was part of the Independent State of Croatia (NDH), and majority of Bosnian Muslims considered themselves to be ethnic Croats.

Even in the early 1990s, a vast majority of Bosnian Muslims considered themselves to be ethnic Muslims, rather than Bosniaks. According to a poll from 1990, only 1.8% of the citizens of Bosnia and Herzegovina supported the idea of Bosniak national identity, while 17% considered that the name encompasses all of the inhabitants of Bosnia and Herzegovina. Their main political party, the Party of Democratic Action, rejected the idea of Bosniak identity and managed to expel those that promoted it. The supporters of the Bosniak nationhood established their own political party, the Muslim Bosniak Organisation, and received only 1.1% of the votes during the 1990 general election.

On 27 September 1993, however, after the leading political, cultural, and religious representatives of Bosnian Muslims held an assembly and at the same time when they rejected the Owen–Stoltenberg peace plan adopted the Bosniak name deciding to "return to our people their historical and national name of Bosniaks, to tie ourselves in this way for our country of Bosnia and its state-legal tradition, for our Bosnian language and all spiritual tradition of our history". The main reasons for the SDA to adopt the Bosniak identity, only three years after expelling the supporters of the idea from their party ranks, however, was due to reasons of foreign policy. One of the leading SDA figures Džemaludin Latić, the editor of the official gazette of the party, commented the decision stating that: "In Europe, he who doesn't have a national name, doesn't have a country" and that "we must be Bosniaks, that what we are, in order to survive in our country". The decision to adopt the Bosniak identity was largely influenced by the change of opinion of the former communist intellectuals such as Atif Purivatra, Alija Isaković and those who were a part of the pan-Islamists such as Rusmir Mahmutćehajić (who was a staunch opponent of Bosniak identity), all of whom saw the changing of the name to Bosniak as a way to connect the Bosnian Muslims to the country of Bosnia and Herzegovina.

In other ex-Yugoslav countries with significant Slavic Muslim populations, adoption of the Bosniak name has been less consistent. The effects of this phenomenon can best be seen in the censuses. For instance, the 2003 Montenegrin census recorded 48,184 people who registered as Bosniaks and 28,714 who registered as Muslim by nationality. Although Montenegro's Slavic Muslims form one ethnic community with a shared culture and history, this community is divided on whether to register as Bosniaks (i.e. adopt Bosniak national identity) or as Muslims by nationality. Similarly, the 2002 Slovenian census recorded 8,062 people who registered as Bosnians, presumably highlighting (in large part) the decision of many secular Bosniaks to primarily identify themselves in that way (a situation somewhat comparable to the Yugoslav option during the socialist period). However, such people comprise a minority (even in countries such as Montenegro where it is a significant political issue) while the great majority of Slavic Muslims in the former Yugoslavia have adopted the Bosniak national name.

Relation to Croat and Serb nationalism 
As a melting ground for confrontations between different religions, national mythologies, and concepts of statehood, much of the historiography of Bosnia and Herzegovina has since the 19th century been the subject of competing Serb and Croat nationalist claims part of wider Serbian and Croatian hegemonic aspirations in Bosnia and Herzegovina, inherently interwoven into the complex nature of the Bosnian War at the end of the 20th century.
As Andras Riedlmayers's research for the Hague Tribunal demonstrates: What happened in Bosnia is not just genocide, the willful destruction of the essential foundations of one particular community or group of people within a society [....] What happened in Bosnia is also described as sociocide, the murdering of a progressive, complex, and enlightened society in order that a regressive, simple, and bigoted society could replace it.

According to Mitja Velikonja, Bosnia and Herzegovina constitutes "a historical entity which has its own identity and its own history". Robert Donia claims that as Serbia and Croatia only occupied parts of Bosnia and Herzegovina briefly in the Middle Ages, neither have any serious historical claims to Bosnia. Moreover, Donia states that although Bosnia did interact with its Serb and Croat neighbors over the centuries, it had a very different history and culture from them. 12th-century Byzantine historian John Kinnamos reported that Bosnia was not subordinated to the Grand Count of Serbia; rather the Bosnians had their own distinct way of life and government. The expert on medieval Balkan history John V.A. Fine reports that the Bosnians (Bošnjani) have been a distinct people since at least the 10th century.

It is noted that writers on nationalism in Yugoslavia or the Bosnian War tend to ignore or overlook the Bosnian Muslim ideology and activity and see them as victims of other nationalisms and not nationalistic themselves.

History

Middle Ages

Arrival of the Slavs 

The western Balkans had been reconquered from "barbarians" by Byzantine Emperor Justinian (r. 527–565). Sclaveni (Slavs) raided the western Balkans, including Bosnia, in the 6th century. The De Administrando Imperio (DAI; ca. 960) mentions Bosnia (/Bosona) as a "small/little land" (or "small country", /horion Bosona) part of Byzantium, having been settled by Slavic groups along with the river Bosna, Zahumlje and Travunija (both with territory in modern-day Bosnia and Herzegovina); This is the first mention of a Bosnian entity; it was not a national entity, but a geographical one, mentioned strictly as an integral part of Byzantium. Some scholars assert that the inclusion of Bosnia in Serbia merely reflect the status in DAI's time. In the Early Middle Ages, Fine, Jr. believes that what is today western Bosnia and Herzegovina was part of Croatia, while the rest was divided between Croatia and Serbia.

After the death of Serbian ruler Časlav (r. ca. 927–960), Bosnia seems to have broken away from the Serbian state and became politically independent. Bulgaria briefly subjugated Bosnia at the turn of the 10th century, after which it became part of the Byzantine Empire. In the 11th century, Bosnia was part of the Serbian state of Duklja.

In 1137, the Kingdom of Hungary annexed most of the Bosnia region, then briefly lost it in 1167 to Byzantium before regaining her in the 1180s. Prior to 1180 (the reign of Ban Kulin) parts of Bosnia were briefly found in Serb or Croat units. Anto Babić notes that "Bosnia is mentioned on several occasions as a land of equal importance and on the same footing as all other [South Slavic] lands of this area."

Banate of Bosnia and the Bosnian Church 

Christian missions emanating from Rome and Constantinople had since the ninth century pushed into the Balkans and firmly established Catholicism in Croatia, while Orthodoxy came to prevail in Bulgaria, Macedonia, and eventually most of Serbia. Bosnia, lying in between, remained a no-man's land due to its mountainous terrain and poor communications. By the twelfth century most Bosnians were probably influenced by a nominal form of Catholicism characterized by a widespread illiteracy and, not least, lack of knowledge in Latin amongst Bosnian clergymen. Around this period, Bosnian independence from Hungarian overlordship was effected during the reign (1180–1204) of Kulin Ban whose rule marked the start of a religiopolitical controversy involving the native Bosnian Church. The Hungarians, frustrated by Bosnia's assertion of independence, successfully denigrated its patchy Christianity as heresy; in turn rendering a pretext to reassert their authority in Bosnia. Hungarian efforts to gain the loyalty and cooperation of the Bosnians by attempting to establish religious jurisdiction over Bosnia failed however, inciting the Hungarians to persuade the papacy to declare a crusade: finally invading Bosnia and warring there between 1235 and 1241. Experiencing various gradual success against stubborn Bosnian resistance, the Hungarians eventually withdrew weakened by a Mongol attack on Hungary. On the request of the Hungarians, Bosnia was subordinated to a Hungarian archbishop by the pope, though rejected by the Bosnians, the Hungarian-appointed bishop was driven out of Bosnia. The Bosnians, rejecting ties with international Catholicism came to consolidate their own independent church, known as the Bosnian Church, condemned as heretical by both the Roman Catholic and Eastern Orthodox churches. Though scholars have traditionally claimed the church to be of a dualist, or neo-Manichaean or Bogomil nature (characterized by the rejection of an omnipotent God, the Trinity, church buildings, the cross, the cult of saints, and religious art), some, such as John Fine, have stressed domestic evidence indicating the retention of basic Catholic theology throughout the Middle Ages. Most scholars agree that adherents of the church referred to themselves by a number of names; dobri Bošnjani or Bošnjani ("good Bosnians" or simply "Bosnians"), Krstjani (Christians), dobri mužje (good men), dobri ljudi (good people) and boni homines (following the example of a dualist group in Italy). Catholic sources refer to them as patarini (patarenes), while the Serbs called them Babuni (after Babuna Mountain), the Serb term for Bogomils. The Ottomans referred to them as kristianlar while the Orthodox and Catholics were called gebir or kafir, meaning "unbeliever".

Expansion and the Bosnian Kingdom 

The Bosnian state was significantly strengthened under the rule (ca. 1318–1353) of ban Stephen II of Bosnia who patched up Bosnia's relations with the Hungarian kingdom and expanded the Bosnian state, in turn incorporating Catholic and Orthodox domains to the west and south; the latter following the conquer of Zahumlje (roughly modern-day Herzegovina) from the Serbian Nemanjić dynasty. In the 1340s, Franciscan missions were launched against alleged "heresy" in Bosnia; prior to this, there had been no Catholics – or at least no Catholic clergy or organization – in Bosnia proper for nearly a century. By the year 1347, Stephen II was the first Bosnian ruler to accept Catholicism, which from then on came to be – at least nominally – the religion of all of Bosnia's medieval rulers, except for possibly Stephen Ostoja of Bosnia (1398–1404, 1409–18) who continued to maintain close relations with the Bosnian Church. The Bosnian nobility would subsequently often undertake nominal oaths to quell "heretical movements" – in reality, however, the Bosnian state was characterized by a religious plurality and tolerance up until the Ottoman invasion of Bosnia in 1463.

By the 1370s, the Banate of Bosnia had evolved into the powerful Kingdom of Bosnia following the coronation of Tvrtko I of Bosnia as the first Bosnian king in 1377, further expanding into neighboring Serb and Croat dominions. However, even with the emergence of a kingdom, no concrete Bosnian identity emerged; religious plurality, independent-minded nobility, and a rugged, mountainous terrain precluded cultural and political unity. As Noel Malcolm stated: "All that one can sensibly say about the ethnic identity of the Bosnians is this: they were the Slavs who lived in Bosnia."

Islamization and Ottoman Empire 

Upon his father's death in 1461, Stephen Tomašević succeeded to the throne of Bosnia, a kingdom whose existence was being increasingly threatened by the Ottomans. In the same year, Stephen Tomašević made an alliance with the Hungarians and asked Pope Pius II for help in the face of an impending Ottoman invasion. In 1463, after a dispute over the tribute paid annually by the Bosnian Kingdom to the Ottomans, he sent for help from the Venetians. However, no help ever arrived to Bosnia from Christendom; King Matthias Corvinus of Hungary, Skenderbeg of Albania and the Ragusans all failed to carry out their promises, while the Venetians flatly refused the king's pleas.

The Croatian humanist and poet Marko Marulić, known as the Father of the Croatian Renaissance, wrote Molitva suprotiva Turkom (Prayer against the Turks) – a poem in 172 doubly rhymed dodecasyllablic stanzas of anti-Turkish theme, written between 1493 and 1500, where he, among others, included Bosnians as the one of peoples who resisted the Ottomans.
The rise of Ottoman rule in the Balkans modified the religious picture of Bosnia and Herzegovina as the Ottomans brought with them a new religion, Islam. Throughout the entire Balkans people were sporadically converting in small numbers; Bosnia, by contrast, experienced a rapid and extensive conversion of the local population to Islam, and by the early 1600s approximately two thirds of the population of Bosnia were Muslim. Slovenian observer Benedikt Kuripečič compiled the first reports of the religious communities in the 1530s. According to the records for 1528 and 1529, there were a total of 42,319 Christian and 26,666 Muslim households in the sanjaks (Ottoman administrative units) of Bosnia, Zvornik and Herzegovina. In a 1624 report on Bosnia (excluding Herzegovina) by Peter Masarechi, an early-seventeenth-century apostolic visitor of the Roman Catholic Church to Bosnia, the population figures are given as 450,000 Muslims, 150,000 Catholics and 75,000 Orthodox Christians. Generally, historians agree that the Islamization of the Bosnian population was not the result of violent methods of conversions but was, for the most part, peaceful and voluntary. Scholars have long debated the reasons that made this collective acceptance of Islam possible among the Bosnians, although the religious dynamic of medieval Bosnia is frequently cited. Peter Masarechi, saw four basic reasons to explain the more intensive Islamization in Bosnia: the 'heretical past' of the Bosnians, which had left them confessionally weak and capable of transferring their allegiance to Islam; the example of many Bosnians who had attained high office through the devşirme, and as powerful men were in a position to encourage their relatives and associates to convert; a desire to escape from the burdens of taxation and other services levied on non-Muslim citizens; and finally, an equally strong desire to escape the proselytizing importunities of Franciscan monks among the Orthodox population. Ottoman records show that on many occasions devşirme practise was voluntarily in Bosnia. For examples, 1603-4 levies from Bosnia and Albania implies that there were attempts of such youths and their families to include themselves amongst those selected. It also shows that the levy took an entire year to be completed. Of the groups sent from Bosnia, unusually, 410 children were Muslims, and only 82 were Christians. This was due to the so-called ‘special permission’ granted in response to the request by Mehmed II to Bosnia, which was the only area Muslim boys were taken from. These children were called "poturoğulları" (Bosnian Muslim boys conscripted for the janissary army). They were taken only into service under bostancıbaşı, in the palace gardens.

Always on purely religious grounds, it is also said, by the orientalist Thomas Walker Arnold for instance, that because of the major heresy in the region at the time, oppressed by the Catholics and against whom Pope John XXII even launched a crusade in 1325, the people were more receptive to the Ottoman Turks. In fact, in the tradition of Bosnian Christians, there were several practices that resembled Islam; for instance; praying five times a day (reciting the Lord's Prayer).
In time, hesitant steps were made toward acceptance of Islam. At first, this Islamisation was more or less nominal. In reality, it was an attempt at reconciling the two faiths. It was a lengthy and halting progress towards the final abandoning of their beliefs. For centuries, they were not considered full-fledged Muslims, and they even paid taxes like Christians. This process of Islamisation was not yet finished in the 17th century, as is witnessed by a keen English observer, Paul Rycaut, who states in The Present State of the Ottoman Empire in 1670: "But those of this Sect who strangely mix Christianity and Mahometanism together, are many of the Souldiers who live on the confines of Serbia and Bosnia; reading the gospel in the Sclavonian tongue…; besides which, they are curious to learn the mysteries of the Alchoran [Quran], and the Law of Arabick tongue. [...] The Potures [Muslims] of Bosna are of this Sect, but pay taxes as Christians do; they abhor Images and the sign of the Cross; they circumcise, bringing the Authority of Christ's example for it."

Many children of Christian parents were separated from their families and raised to be members of the Janissary Corps (this practice was known as the devşirme system, 'devşirmek' meaning 'to gather' or 'to recruit'). Owing to their education (for they were taught arts, science, maths, poetry, literature and many of the languages spoken in the Ottoman Empire), Serbian, Croatian and Bosnian became one of the diplomatic languages at the Porte. The Ottoman period that followed was characterized by a change in the landscape through a gradual modification of the settlements with the introduction of bazaars, military garrisons and mosques. Converting to Islam brought considerable advantages, including access to Ottoman trade networks, bureaucratic positions and the army. As a result, many Bosnians were appointed to serve as beylerbeys, sanjak-beys, mullahs, qadis, pashas, muftis, janissary commanders, writers, and so forth in Istanbul, Jerusalem and Medina. Among these were important historical figures were: prince Sigismund of Bosnia (later Ishak Bey Kraloğlu), Hersekzade Ahmed Pasha, Isa-beg Ishaković, Gazi Husrev-beg, Damat Ibrahim Pasha, Ferhad Pasha Sokolović, Lala Mustafa Pasha and Sarı Süleyman Pasha. At least seven viziers were of Bosnian origin, of which the most renowned was Sokollu Mehmed Pasha (who served as Grand Vizier under three sultans: Suleiman the Magnificent, Selim II, and Murad III). The Ottoman rule also saw many architectural investments in Bosnia and the creation and development of many new cities including Sarajevo and Mostar. This is mostly because of the high esteem the Bosnians held in the eyes of the Sultans and the Turks. Bosnia became also a strategic base from which the Ottomans launched their armies northward and westward on campaigns of conquest and pillage. The Turks regarded Bosnia as a "bastion of Islam" and its inhabitants served as frontier guards (serhatlije). The presence of Bosnians in the Ottoman Empire had an important social and political effect on the country: it created a class of powerful state officials and their descendants which came into conflict with the feudal-military spahis and gradually encroached upon their land, hastening the movement away from the feudal tenure towards private estates and tax-farmers, creating a unique situation in Bosnia where the rulers were native inhabitants converted to Islam. Although geographically located in Europe, Bosnia was perceived as culturally distant. Because of the strong Islamic character of the country during the Ottoman period, Bosnia was perceived as more oriental than the Orient itself, an 'authentic East within Europe'. The English archeologist Arthur Evans, who traveled through Bosnia and Herzegovina in the 1870s, claimed that "Bosnia remains the chosen land of Mahometan [Muslim] Conservatism [...] fanaticism has struck its deepest roots among her renegade population, and reflects itself even in the dress."

Ottoman rule affected the ethnic and religious makeup of Bosnia and Herzegovina in additional ways. A large number of Bosnian Catholics retreated to the still unconquered Catholic regions of Croatia, Dalmatia, and Slovenia, at the time controlled by Habsburg monarchy and the Republic of Venice, respectively. To fill up depopulated areas of northern and western Eyalet of Bosnia, the Ottomans encouraged the migration of large numbers of hardy settlers with military skills from Serbia and Herzegovina. Many of these settlers were Vlachs, members of a nomadic pre-Slav Balkan population that had acquired a Latinate language and specialized in stock breeding, horse raising, long-distance trade, and fighting. Most were members of the Serbian Orthodox church. Before the Ottoman conquest, that church had very few members in the Bosnian lands outside Herzegovina and the eastern strip of the Drina valley; there is no definite evidence of any Orthodox church buildings in central, northern, or western Bosnia before 1463. With time most of the Vlach population adopted a Serb identity.

The Ottoman military reform efforts, that called for further expansion of the centrally controlled army (nizam), new taxes and more Ottoman bureaucracy would have important consequences in Bosnia and Herzegovina. These reforms weakened the special status and privileges of the Bosnian aristocracy and the formation of a modern army endangered the privileges of the Bosnian Muslim military men and of local lords, both were demanding greater independence from the Constantinople. Barbara Jelavich states: "The Muslims of Bosnia and Herzegovina [...] were becoming increasingly disillusioned with the Ottoman government. The centralizing reforms cut directly into their privileges and seemed to offer no compensating benefits. [...]"

Bosnian nationalism 

National consciousness developed in Bosnia and Herzegovina among the three ethnic groups in the 19th century, with emergent national identities being influenced by the millet system in place in Ottoman society (where 'religion and nationality were closely intertwined and often synonyms'). During Ottoman rule, there was a clear distinction between Muslims and non-Muslims. There were different tax categories and clothes, but only in the late 18th- and early 19th century "the differentiations develop into ethnic and national forms of identification", according to Soeren Keil. The bordering countries of Serbia and Croatia consequently laid claim to Bosnia and Herzegovina; a combination of religion, ethnic identity and the territorial claim was the basis for the three distinct nations.

However, members of the 19th century Illyrian movement, most notably franciscan Ivan Franjo Jukić, whose Bosnianhood is apparent from his very pen name "Slavophile Bosniak" (Slavoljub Bošnjak), emphasized Bosniaks (Bosnians) alongside Serbs and Croats as one of the "tribes" that constitute the "Illyrian nation".
 
Influenced by the ideas of the French Revolution and Illyrian Movement, the majority of Bosnian Franciscans supported the freedom, brotherhood, and unity of all South Slavs, while at the same time stressing a unique Bosniak identity as separate from the Serb and Croat identities. However, as pointed out by Denis Bašić, being a Bosniak in the 19th century was very much a social status granted only to the Muslim Bosnian aristocracy. Accordingly, Ivan Franjo Jukić writes in 1851 that "the begs and other Muslim lords call [Slavic-speaking Muslim peasants] Poturice [the Turkified ones] or Ćose [the beardless ones], while Christians call them Balije [a vulgar term that derives from the Ottoman period, and which applied to occasional Bosnian Muslim nomads who lived in mountainous areas. Today it is considered the most derogatory term for Bosniaks]." Sometimes the term Turčin (Turk) was commonly used to describe the Bosnian and other Slavic Muslims, designating religious, and not ethnic belonging. The Italian diplomat M. A. Pigafetta, wrote in 1585 that Bosnian Christian converts to Islam refused to be identified as "Turks", but as "Muslims". Klement Božić, an interpreter at the Prussian consulate in Bosnia during the 19th century stated that the "Bosnian Christians are calling their Muslim compatriots as 'Turks' and Muslim foreigners as 'Ottomans'; nor will ever a Muslim Bosniak say to an Ottoman, that he is a Turk or call him his brother. [...] A Bosniak Muslim can not tolerate the Ottomans and he [the Ottoman] despises the Bosniak". Conrad Malte-Brun, a French-Danish geographer, states also in his Universal Geography, in 1829, that the term infidel is commonly used among the Muslims of Constantinople to depict the Muslims of Bosnia; further he states that Bosnians descended from the warriors of the northern race, and that their barbarism needs to be imputed to an intellectual separation from the rest of the Europe, because of their lack of the enlightenment of Christendom. Croatian writer Matija Mažuranić wrote in 1842 that "in Bosnia Christians do not dare to call themselves Bosniaks. Mohammedans consider only themselves Bosniaks and Christians are only the Bosniak serfs (raya) or, to use the other word, Vlachs." The Muslim city people, craftsmen and artisans, i.e., those who were not serfs but rather free, that is, tax-exempt, also called themselves Bosniaks and their language bošnjački (Tur. boşnakça). The French diplomat and scholar Massieu de Clerval, who visited Bosnia in 1855, stated in his report that the "Bosnian Greeks [i.e. Orthodox Christians], Muslims and Catholics live together and frequently in very good harmony when foreign influences do not awake fanaticism and the question of religious pride".

Jukić's pupil and fellow friar Antun Knežević, was one of the main protagonists of the multireligious Bošnjak (Bosniak) identity as well, and even more vocal then friar Jukić. Prior to that it was Franciscan Filip Lastrić (1700–1783) who first wrote on the commonality of the citizens in the Bosnian eyalet, regardless of their religion. In his work Epitome vetustatum provinciae Bosniensis (1765), he claimed that all inhabitants of the Bosnian province (eyalet) constituted "one people" of the same descent.

Austro-Hungarian Empire 

The conflict rapidly spread and came to involve several Balkan states and Great Powers, which eventually forced the Ottomans to cede administration of the country to Austria-Hungary through the Treaty of Berlin (1878).
After the uprising in Herzegovina (1875–78) the population of Bosnian Muslims and Orthodox Christians in Bosnia decreased. The Orthodox Christian population (534,000 in 1870) decreased by 7 percent while Muslims decreased by a third. The Austrian census in 1879 recorded altogether 449,000 Muslims, 496,485 Orthodox Christians and 209,391 Catholics in Bosnia and Herzegovina. The losses were 245,000 Muslims and 37,500 Orthodox Christians.
 

During the 20th century Bosnian Muslims founded several cultural and welfare associations in order to promote and preserve their cultural identity. The most prominent associations were Gajret, Merhamet, Narodna Uzdanica and later Preporod. The Bosnian Muslim intelligentsia also gathered around the magazine Bosnia in the 1860s to promote the idea of a unified Bosniak nation. This Bosniak group would remain active for several decades, with the continuity of ideas and the use of the Bosniak name. From 1891 until 1910, they published a Latin-script magazine titled Bošnjak (Bosniak), which promoted the concept of Bosniakism (Bošnjaštvo) and openness toward European culture. Since that time the Bosniaks adopted European culture under the broader influence of Habsburg Monarchy. At the same time they kept the peculiar characteristics of their Bosnian Islamic lifestyle. These initial, but important initiatives were followed by a new magazine named Behar whose founders were Safvet-beg Bašagić (1870–1934), Edhem Mulabdić (1862–1954) and Osman Nuri Hadžić (1869–1937).

After the occupation of Bosnia and Herzegovina in 1878, the Austrian administration of Benjamin Kallay, the Austro-Hungarian governor of Bosnia and Herzegovina, officially endorsed "Bosniakhood" as the basis of a multi-confessional Bosnian nation that would include Christians as well as Muslims. The policy attempted to isolate Bosnia and Herzegovina from its neighbors (Orthodox Serbia and Catholic Croatia, but also the Muslims of the Ottoman Empire) and to negate the concepts of Serbian and Croatian nationhood which had already begun to take ground among the country's Orthodox and Catholic communities, respectively. The notion of Bosnian nationhood was, however, firmly established only among the Bosnian Muslims, while fiercely opposed by Serb and Croat nationalists who were instead seeking to claim Bosnian Muslims as their own, a move that was rejected by most of them.

After Kallay's death in 1903, the official policy slowly drifted towards accepting the three-ethnic reality of Bosnia and Herzegovina. Ultimately, the failure of Austro-Hungarian ambitions to nurture a Bosniak identity amongst the Catholic and Orthodox led to almost exclusively Bosnian Muslims adhering to it, with 'Bosniakhood' consequently adopted as a Bosnian Muslim ethnic ideology by nationalist figures.

In November 1881, upon introducing the Bosnian-Herzegovinian Infantry, the Austro-Hungarian government passed a Military Law (Wehrgesetz) imposing an obligation upon all Bosnian Muslims to serve in the Imperial Army, which led to widespread riots in December 1881 and throughout 1882; the Austrians appealed to the Mufti of Sarajevo, Mustafa Hilmi Hadžiomerović (born 1816) and he soon issued a Fatwa "calling on the Bosniaks to obey military Law." Other important Muslim community leaders such as Mehmed-beg Kapetanović Ljubušak, later Mayor of Sarajevo, also appealed to young Muslim men to serve in the Habsburg military.

In 1903, the Gajret cultural society was established; it promoted Serb identity among the Slavic Muslims of Austria-Hungary (today's Bosnia and Herzegovina) and viewed that the Muslims were Serbs lacking ethnic consciousness. The view that Muslims were Serbs is probably the oldest of three ethnic theories among the Bosnian Muslims themselves.
At the outbreak of World War I, Bosnian Muslims were conscripted to serve in the Austro-Hungarian army, some chose to desert rather than fight against fellow Slavs, whilst some Bosniaks attacked Bosnian Serbs in apparent anger after the assassination of Archduke Franz Ferdinand. Austro-Hungarian authorities in Bosnia and Herzegovina imprisoned and extradited approximately 5,500 prominent Serbs, 700–2,200 of whom died in prison. 460 Serbs were sentenced to death and a predominantly Bosniak special militia known as the Schutzkorps was established and carried out the persecution of Serbs. Neven Anđelić writes One can only guess what kind of feeling was dominant in Bosnia at the time. Both animosity and tolerance existed at the same time.

Yugoslavia and World War II 

After World War I, the Kingdom of Serbs, Croats and Slovenes (later known as the Kingdom of Yugoslavia) was formed. In it, Bosnian Muslims alongside Macedonians and Montenegrins were not acknowledged as a distinct ethnic group. However; the first provisional cabinet included a Muslim.

Politically, Bosnia and Herzegovina was split into four banovinas with Muslims being the minority in each. After the Cvetković-Maček Agreement 13 counties of Bosnia and Herzegovina were incorporated into the Banovina of Croatia and 38 counties into the projected Serbian portion of Yugoslavia. In calculating the division, the Muslims were discounted altogether which prompted the Bosnian Muslims into creating the Movement for the Autonomy of Bosnia-Herzegovina. Moreover, land reforms proclaimed in the February 1919 affected 66.9 per cent of the land in Bosnia and Herzegovina. Given that the old landowning was predominantly Bosnian Muslim, the land reforms were resisted. Violence against Muslims and the enforced seizure of their lands shortly ensued. Bosnian Muslims were offered compensation but it was never fully materialized. The regime sought to pay 255,000,000 dinars in compensation per a period of 40 years with an interest rate of 6%.  Payments began in 1936 and were expected to be completed in 1975; however in 1941 World War Two erupted and only 10% of the projected remittances were made.

During World War II, Bosnian Muslim elite and notables issued resolutions or memorandums in various cities that publicly denounced Croat-Nazi collaborationist measures, laws and violence against Serbs: Prijedor (23 September), Sarajevo (the Resolution of Sarajevo Muslims of 12 October), Mostar (21 October), Banja Luka (12 November), Bijeljina (2 December) and Tuzla (11 December). The resolutions condemned the Ustaše in Bosnia and Herzegovina, both for their mistreatment of Muslims and for their attempts at turning Muslims and Serbs against one another. One memorandum declared that since the beginning of the Ustaše regime, that Muslims dreaded the lawless activities that some Ustaše, some Croatian government authorities, and various illegal groups perpetrated against the Serbs. A great deal of the Bosnian Muslim population however sided with the Ustaše. Muslims composed approximately 12 percent of the civil service and armed forces of the Independent State of Croatia. Some of them also participated in Ustaše atrocities, while Bosnian Muslims in Nazi Waffen-SS units were responsible for massacres of Serbs in northwest and eastern Bosnia, most notably in Vlasenica. At this time several massacres against Bosnian Muslims were carried out by Serb and Montenegrin Chetniks.

It is estimated that 75,000 Muslims died in the war, although the number may have been as high as 86,000 or 6.8 percent of their pre-war population. A number of Muslims joined the Yugoslav Partisan forces, "making it a truly multi-ethnic force". In the entirety of the war, the Yugoslav Partisans of Bosnia and Herzegovina were 23 percent Muslim. Even so, Serb-dominated Yugoslav Partisans would often enter Bosnian Muslim villages, killing Bosnian Muslim intellectuals and other potential opponents. In February 1943, the Germans approved the 13th Waffen Mountain Division of the SS Handschar (1st Croatian) and began recruitment. 

During the socialist Yugoslav period, the Muslims continued to be treated as a religious group instead of an ethnic group. In the 1948 census, Bosnia and Herzegovina's Muslims had three options in the census: "Serb-Muslim", "Croat-Muslim", and "ethnically undeclared Muslim". In the 1953 census the category "Yugoslav, ethnically undeclared" was introduced and the overwhelming majority of those who declared themselves as such were Muslims. Aleksandar Ranković and other Serb communist members opposed the recognition of Bosnian Muslim nationality. Muslim members of the communist party continued in their efforts to get Tito to support their position for recognition. The Bosnian Muslims were recognized as an ethnic group in 1961 but not as a nationality and in 1964 the Fourth Congress of the Bosnian Party assured the Bosnian Muslims the right to self-determination. On that occasion, one of the leading communist leaders, Rodoljub Čolaković, stated that "our Muslim brothers" were equal with Serbs and Croats and that they would not be "forced to declare themselves as Serbs and Croats." He guaranteed them "full freedom in their national determination" Following the downfall of Ranković, Tito changed his view and stated that recognition of Muslims and their national identity should occur. In 1968 the move was protested in the Serb republic and by Serb nationalists such as Dobrica Ćosić. In 1971, the Muslims were fully recognized as a nationality and in the census the option "Muslims by nationality" was added.

Bosnian War 

During the war, the Bosniaks were subject to ethnic cleansing and  genocide. The war caused hundreds of thousands of Bosniaks to flee the nation. The war also caused many drastic demographic changes in Bosnia. Bosniaks were prevalent throughout almost all of Bosnia in 1991, a year before the war officially broke out. As a result of the war, Bosniaks in Bosnia were concentrated mostly in areas that were held by the Bosnian government during the war for independence. Today Bosniaks make up the absolute majority in Sarajevo and its canton, most of northwestern Bosnia around Bihać, as well as central Bosnia, Brčko District, Goražde, Podrinje and parts of Herzegovina.

At the outset of the Bosnian war, forces of the Army of Republika Srpska attacked the Bosnian Muslim civilian population in eastern Bosnia. Once towns and villages were securely in their hands, the Bosnian Serb forces – military, police, the paramilitaries and, sometimes, even Bosnian Serb villagers – applied the same pattern: houses and apartments were systematically ransacked or burnt down, civilians were rounded up or captured, and sometimes beaten or killed in the process. Men and women were separated, with many of the men massacred or detained in the camps. The women were kept in various detention centers where they had to live in intolerably unhygienic conditions, where they were mistreated in many ways including being raped repeatedly. Bosnian Serb soldiers or policemen would come to these detention centres, select one or more women, take them out and rape them.

The Bosnian Serbs had the upper hand due to heavier weaponry (despite less manpower) that was given to them by the Yugoslav People's Army and established control over most areas where Serbs had relative majority but also in areas where they were a significant minority in both rural and urban regions excluding the larger towns of Sarajevo and Mostar. Bosnian Serb military and political leadership received the most accusations of war crimes by the International Criminal Tribunal for the former Yugoslavia (ICTY) many of which have been confirmed after the war in ICTY trials.
Most of the capital Sarajevo was predominantly held by the Bosniaks. In the 44 months of the siege, terror against Sarajevo residents varied in intensity, but the purpose remained the same: inflict suffering on civilians to force the Bosnian authorities to accept Bosnian Serb demands.

Geographical distribution

Diaspora 

There is a significant Bosniak diaspora in Europe, Turkey as well as in North America in such countries as the United States and Canada.

Turkey: The community in Turkey has its origins predominantly in the exodus of Muslims from the Bosnia Eyalet taking place in the 19th and early 20th century as result of the collapse of Ottoman rule in the Balkans. According to estimates commissioned in 2008 by the National Security Council of Turkey as many as 2 million Turkish citizens are of Bosniak ancestry. Bosniaks mostly live in the Marmara Region, in the north-west. The biggest Bosniak community in Turkey is in Istanbul; the borough Yenibosna (formerly Saraybosna, after Sarajevo), saw rapid migration from the Ottoman Balkans after the founding of the Republic of Turkey. There are notable Bosniak communities in İzmir, Karamürsel, Yalova, Bursa and Edirne.
United States: The first Bosnian arrivals came around the 1860s. According to a 2000 estimate, there are some 350,000 Americans of Bosnian ancestry. Bosniaks were early leaders in the establishment of Chicago's Muslim community. In 1906, they established Džemijetul Hajrije (The Benevolent Society) of Illinois to preserve the community's religious and national traditions as well as to provide mutual assistance for funerals and illness. The organization established chapters in Gary, Indiana, in 1913, and Butte, Montana, in 1916, and is the oldest existing Muslim organization in the United States. There are numerous Bosniak cultural, sport and religious associations. Bosnian-language newspapers and other periodicals are published in many states; the largest in the United States is the St. Louis based newspaper "Sabah". At the peak of the Bosnian presence in St. Louis 70,000 Bosnians lived in the city.
Canada: According to the 2001 census, there are 25,665 people who claimed Bosnian ancestry. A large majority of Bosnian Canadians emigrated to Canada during and after the Bosnian War, although Bosnian migration dates back to the 19th century. Traditional centers of residence and culture for people from Bosnia and Herzegovina are in Toronto, Montreal and Vancouver. Numerous Bosniak cultural, sport and religious associations, Bosnian-language newspapers and other periodicals are published in many states. The largest Bosnian organisation in Canada is the Congress of North American Bosniaks.

Culture

Language 

  
Most Bosniaks speak the Bosnian language, a South Slavic language of the Western South Slavic subgroup. Standard Bosnian is considered a variety of Serbo-Croatian, as mutually intelligible with the Croatian and Serbian languages which are all based on the Shtokavian dialect. As result, paraphrases such as Serbo-Croat-Bosnian (SCB) or Bosnian/Croatian/Serbian (BCS) tend to be used in English on occasion.

At the vernacular level, Bosniaks are more linguistically homogeneous than Serbs or Croats who also speak non-standard dialects beside Shtokavian. With respect to lexicon, Bosnian is characterized by its larger number of Ottoman Turkish (as well as Arabic and Persian) loanwords (called Orientalisms) in relation to the other Serbo-Croatian varieties.

The first official dictionary in the Bosnian language was published in 1992. Church Slavonic is attested since at least the Kingdom of Bosnia; the Charter of Ban Kulin, written in Cyrillic, remains one of the oldest written South Slavic state documents.

The modern Bosnian language principally uses the Latin alphabet. However, Cyrillic (popularly termed Bosnian Cyrillic or Bosančica) was employed much earlier, as evident in medieval charters and on monumental tombstones (stećci) found scattered throughout the landscape. One of the most important documents is the Charter of Ban Kulin, which is regarded by Bosnian authors as one of the oldest official recorded documents to be written in Bosnian Cyrillic. The use of Cyrillic was largely replaced by Arebica (Matufovica), a Bosnian variant of the Perso-Arabic script, upon the introduction of Islam in the 15th century, first among the elite, then amongst the public, and was commonly used up until the 19th century.

Folklore

There are many signs of pagan practices being carried over first into Christianity and later into Islam in Bosnia and Herzegovina – for example, the use of the mountain tops as a place of worship, and the name of pagan gods, such as Perun and Thor, that survived in oral tradition until the twentieth century. Slavic traditions such as dragons, fairies and Vila, are also present. Fairies are often mentioned in Bosniak epics, poetry and folk songs. Well known are "gorske vile", or fairies from the mountains which dance on very green meadows. The cult of post-pagan Perun survived as the day of Elijah the Thunderer which was another important event for Bosnian Muslims. Muhamed Hadžijahić mentions: "In Muslim celebration of this holiday, we see traces of ancient pagan traditions related to cult of sun and rain." This tradition is among Bosnian Muslims known as Aliđun and among the Serbs as Ilijevdan. Pre-Slavic influences are far less common but nonetheless present. Certain elements of paleo-Balkan beliefs have also been found. One of these traditions which could originate from the pre-Slavic era, is a Bosniak tradition of placing a horse's scull tied with a rope into river Bosna, to fight off drought. Djevojačka pećina, or the Maiden's Cave, is a traditional place of the 'Rain Prayer' near Kladanj in north-eastern Bosnia, where Bosnian Muslims gather to pray for the soul of the maiden whose grave is said to be at the entrance to the cave. This tradition is of pre-Islamic origin and is a place where the followers of the medieval Bosnian Church held their pilgrimage. Another Bosnian Muslim place of pilgrimage is Ajvatovica near Prusac in central Bosnia and Herzegovina, which is the largest Islamic traditional, religious and cultural event in Europe, and is a place where devout Bosnian Muslims remember and give thanks to the founder of the holy site, Ajvaz-dedo, whose forty day prayers were heard by Allah and much needed water came out of a rock that had split open in a miraculous act. Even though the pilgrimage at Ajvatovica is a marking of the sixteenth-century conversion to Islam in Bosnia,

National heroes are typically historical figures, whose lives and skills in battle are emphasized. These include figures such as Ban Kulin, the founder of medieval Bosnia who has come to acquire a legendary status. The historian William Miller wrote in 1921 that "even today, the people regard him as a favorite of the fairies, and his reign as a golden age.";

Traditions and customs

The nation takes pride in the native melancholic folk songs sevdalinka, the precious medieval filigree manufactured by old Sarajevo craftsmen, and a wide array of traditional wisdom transmitted to newer generations by word of mouth, but in recent years written down in a number of books. Another prevalent tradition is "Muštuluk", whereby a gift is owed to any bringer of good news.

Rural folk traditions in Bosnia include the shouted, polyphonic ganga and ravne pjesme (flat song) styles, as well as instruments like a wooden flute and šargija. The gusle, an instrument found throughout the Balkans, is also used to accompany ancient South Slavic epic poems. The most versatile and skillful gusle-performer of Bosniak ethnicity was the Montenegrin Bosniak Avdo Međedović (1875–1953).

Probably the most distinctive and identifiably Bosniak of music, Sevdalinka is a kind of emotional, melancholic folk song that often describes sad subjects such as love and loss, the death of a dear person or heartbreak. Sevdalinkas were traditionally performed with a saz, a Turkish string instrument, which was later replaced by the accordion.  However the more modern arrangement, to the derision of some purists, is typically a vocalist accompanied by the accordion along with snare drums, upright bass, guitars, clarinets and violins. Sevdalinkas are unique to Bosnia and Herzegovina. They arose in Ottoman Bosnia as urban Bosnian music with often oriental influences. In the early 19th century, Bosniak poet Umihana Čuvidina contributed greatly to sevdalinka with her poems about her lost love, which she sang. The poets which in large has contributed to the rich heritage of Bosniak  people, include among others Derviš-paša Bajezidagić, Abdullah Bosnevi, Hasan Kafi Pruščak, Abdurrahman Sirri, Abdulvehab Ilhamija, Mula Mustafa Bašeskija, Hasan Kaimija, Ivan Franjo Jukić, Safvet-beg Bašagić, Musa Ćazim Ćatić, Mak Dizdar, as many prominent prose writers, such as Enver Čolaković, Skender Kulenović, Abdulah Sidran, Nedžad Ibrišimović, Zaim Topčić and Zlatko Topčić. Historical journals as Gajret, Behar and Bošnjak are some of the most prominent publications, which in a big way contributed to the preservation of the Bosniak identity in late 19th and early 20th century. The Bosnian literature, are generally known for their ballads; The Mourning Song of the Noble Wife of the Hasan Aga (or better known as Hasanaginica), Smrt Omera i Merime (Omer and Merimas death) and Smrt braće Morića (The death of brothers Morić). Hasanaginica were told from generation to generation in oral form, until it was finally written and published in 1774 by an Italian anthropologist Alberto Fortis, in his book Viaggio in Dalmazia ("Journey to Dalmatia").

Religion

The Bosnian Muslims (Bosniaks) are traditionally and predominantly Sunni Muslim. Historically Sufism has also played a significant role among the Bosnian Muslims who tended to favor more mainstream Sunni orders such as the Naqshbandiyya, Rifa'i and Qadiriyya. There are also Bosniaks who can be categorized as Nondenominational Muslims and Cultural Muslims. The Bosnian Islamic community has also been influenced by other currents within Islam than the one in Bosnia and Herzegovina prevailing Hanafi school, especially since the 1990s war. The position of Sufism in Bosnia during the Ottoman era was legally the same as in other parts of the empire. Bosnian Sufis produced literature, often in oriental languages (Arabic and Turkish), although a few also wrote in Serbo-Croatian, such as Abdurrahman Sirri (1785–1846/47) and Abdulwahāb Žepčewī (1773–1821). Another Sufi from Bosnia was Sheikh Hali Hamza, whose doctrines were considered to contradict the official interpretation of Islam. His supporters hamzevije formed a religious movement that is often described as a sect closely related to the tariqa of bajrami-melami. Another prominent Bosniak Sufi was Hasan Kafi Pruščak, a Sufi thinker and the most prominent figure of the scientific literature and intellectual life of the 16th century Bosniaks.

In a 1998 public opinion poll, 78.3% of Bosniaks in the Federation of Bosnia and Herzegovina declared themselves to be religious. Bosnian Muslims tend to often be described as moderate, secular and European-oriented compared to other Muslim groups. Bosniaks have been described as "Cultural Muslims" or "Progressive Muslims".

Kjell Magnusson points out that religion played a major role in the processes that shaped the national movements and the formation of the new states in the Balkans after the Ottoman retreat, since the Ottomans distinguished peoples after their religious affiliations. Although religion only plays a minor role in the daily lives of the ethnic groups of Bosnia and Herzegovina today, the following stereotypes are still rather current, namely, that the Serbs are Orthodox, the Croats Catholic and the Bosniaks Muslim; those native Bosnians who remained Christian and did not convert to Islam over time came to identify as ethnic Serb or Croat, helping to explain the apparent ethnic mix in Bosnia-Herzegovina. Still, however, there are a few individuals who violate the aforementioned pattern and practice other religions actively, often due to intermarriage.

Surnames and given names

There are some Bosniak surnames of foreign origin, indicating that the founder of the family came from a place outside Bosnia and Herzegovina. Many such Bosniak surnames have Albanian, Vlach, Turkic or Arab origins. Examples of such surnames include Arnautović (from Arnaut - Turkish ethnonym used to denote Albanians), Vlasić (from Vlach people), Tatarević (from Tatar people) and Arapović (from Arap - Turkish ethnonym used to denote Arabs). There are also some surnames which are presumed to be of pre-Slavic origin. Some examples of such surnames may be of Illyrian or Celtic origin, such as the surname Mataruga and Motoruga.

Given names or first names among Bosniaks have mostly Arabic, Persian or Turkish, roots such as Osman, Mehmed, Muhamed, Mirza, Alija, Ismet, Kemal, Hasan, Ibrahim, Irfan, Mustafa, Ahmed, Husein, Hamza, Haris, Halid, Refik, Tarik, Faruk, Abdulah, Amer, Sulejman, Mahir, Enver, and many others. South Slavic given names such as "Zlatan" or "Zlatko" are also present primarily among non-religious Bosniaks. What is notable however is that due to the structure of the Bosnian language, many of the Muslim given names have been altered to create uniquely Bosniak given names. Some of the Oriental given names have been shortened. For example: Huso short for Husein, Ahmo short for Ahmed, Meho short for Mehmed. One example of this is that of the Bosniak humorous characters Mujo and Suljo, whose given names are actually Bosniak short forms of Mustafa and Sulejman. More present still is the transformation of given names that in Arabic or Turkish are confined to one gender to apply to the other sex. In Bosnian, simply taking away the letter "a" changes the traditionally feminine "Jasmina" into the popular male name "Jasmin". Similarly, adding an "a" to the typically male "Mahir" results in the feminine "Mahira".

Symbols

The traditional symbol of the Bosniak people is a fleur-de-lis coat of arms, decorated with six golden lilies, also referred to Lilium bosniacum, a native lily of the region. This Bosniak national symbol is derived from the coat of arms of the medieval Kingdom of Bosnia, and was particularly used in the context of the rule of Bosnian King Tvrtko I of Bosnia. According to some sources, the Bosnian coat of arms, with six golden lilies, originated from the French descended Capetian House of Anjou. The member of this dynasty, Louis I of Hungary, was married to Elizabeth of Bosnia, daughter of the ban Stephen II of Bosnia, with Tvrtko I consequently embracing the heraldic lily as a symbol of the Bosnian royalty in token of the familial relations between the Angevins and the Bosnian royal family. It is also likely that the Bosnians adopted, or were granted, the fleur-de-lis on their coat of arms as a reward for taking the Angevin side.

This emblem was revived in 1992 as a symbol of Bosnian nationhood and represented the flag of the Republic of Bosnia and Herzegovina between 1992 and 1998. Although the state insignia was replaced in 1999 on request of the other two ethnic groups, the flag of the Federation of Bosnia and Herzegovina still features a fleur-de-lis alongside the Croatian chequy. The Bosnian fleur-de-lis also appears on the flags and arms of many cantons, municipalities, cities and towns. It is still used as official insignia of the Bosniak regiment of the Armed Forces of Bosnia and Herzegovina. The Fleur-de-lis can also be commonly found as ornament in mosques and on Muslim tombstones. Swedish historian Senimir Resić states that the emblem of the fleur-de-lis (symbolizing the Christian Middle Ages) which become a national symbol of Bosniaks in 1992, was, in that time of war and Islamophobia, intended to draw attention to the Western world of the Christian and medieval European past of the Bosnian Muslims.

Another Bosniak flag dates from the Ottoman era, and is a white crescent moon and star on a green background. The flag was also the symbol of the short-lived independent Bosnia in the 19th century and of the Bosnian uprising against the Turks led by Husein Gradaščević.

Historiography

See also 

List of Bosniaks
Constitutional nations of Bosnia and Herzegovina 
Bushnak
Bosnian War
Croat–Bosniak War

Notes

References

Sources 
Books
 
 
 
 
 
 
 
 Friedman, Francine "The Bosnian Muslims: The Making of a Yugoslav Nation," in Melissa Bokovoy, Jill Irvine, and Carol Lilly, eds., State-Society Relations in Yugoslavia, 1945–1992, 1997
 
 
 
 
 
 
 
 
 

Journals

Bauer, Deron. The ethno-religious identity of Bosnian Muslims: A literature-based ethnography. Fuller Theological Seminary, School of Intercultural Studies, 2012.

External links

Bosniaks in United States
IGBD – Bosniaks in Germany 
Congress of North American Bosniaks
BAACBH.org – Bosniak American Advisory Council for Bosnia-Herzegovina
Bosniaks – Wiktionary entry for Bosniaks 
BOSNJACI.net 
Facebook page

 
Ethnic groups in Turkey
Ethnic groups in Kosovo
Ethnic groups in Montenegro
Ethnic groups in Serbia
Ethnic groups in Bosnia and Herzegovina
Ethnic groups in Croatia
Ethnic groups in North Macedonia
Slavic ethnic groups
South Slavs
Muslim communities in Europe
Ethnoreligious groups in Europe
Ethnic groups in the Balkans